All In All Alamelu is a 2012 Indian Tamil-language tv series that aired Monday through Friday on KTV from 30 April 2012 to 12 November 2012 at 7:00PM IST for 133 episodes.

The show starred Nalini, Kumareshan, Swaminathan, Roopa sree, Shopnam, Yubina and Sri Lakshmi among others. It was produced by Srikanth Entertainment, director by Suki Jeyaram.

Plot
The serial was carried on in such a way that many current affairs information was included as a factor of gossip. The news and information was carried by the actor/actress throughout each episode and it is not restricted to any particular type (like media or sports). Besides that cooking tips were also shared in each episode.

Cast
 Nalini as  Alamelu
 Roopa Sree as Rekha
 Kumareshan
 Swaminathan
 Shopnam
 Yubina
 Sri Lakshmi

References

External links
 Official Website 
 Sun TV Network
 Sun Group

KTV television series
Tamil-language comedy television series
Tamil-language cooking television series
2012 Tamil-language television series debuts
2010s Tamil-language television series
Tamil-language television shows
2012 Tamil-language television series endings